

Overview 
The Biimaal or Bimal, is a sub-clan of the major Dir clan family. This clan is widely known for leading a resistance against the colonials in southern Somalia for decades which can be compared to the war of the Sayyid in Somaliland. The Biimaal mainly lives in Southern Somalia,  the Somali region of Ethiopia, which their Gaadsen sub-clan mainly inhabits and in the NEP region of Kenya.

Distribution 
The Bimal are the dominant clan in Merca district of Lower Shabelle region and make up the majority in  Jammaame district of Lower Jubba region. They also live in the NEP region of Kenya and especially in large numbers inhabit the Somali region of Ethiopia. The Bimal are a war-like clan that was known for their struggle and long resistance against the Italians.

The Bimal are a Dir clan that migrated to Lower Shabelle centuries ago and settled on the coast between Gelib-marka and Brava as sedentary farmers. The Bimal are divided into four subclans, the Saad, Ismin, Suleyman, and Abdirahman .

As a Dir sub-clan, the Bīmāli have immediate lineal ties with the Gadabuursi, Surre (Abdalle and Qubeys), the Issa, the Bajimal, the Bursuk, the Madigan, the Gurgura, the Garre (the Quranyow sub-clan to be precise as they claim descent from Dir), Gurre, Gariire, other Dir sub-clans and they have lineal ties with the Hawiye (Irir), Hawadle, Ajuraan, Degoodi, Gaalje'el clan groups, who share the same ancestor Samaale.

History
Following the Ajuran state disintegration. A mysterious new group in the vicinity of Merca,  known as the El Amir believe to be from the Abgaal origin made its appearance in the late 17th century. According to an account collected by Guillain in 1847, a leader known as Amir formed a following which invaded the territory of Merca and expelled the Ajuran clan. The El Amir then ruled for thirty-four years until the Biimaal expelled them and definitively occupied Merca. They quickly gained control of the city and trade of the region.

Traditions of Bimal clan of Merka district reflect preoccupied agricultural production for at least the last 200 years.
Besides the Biimal revolt against the Ajuran. Later, they had engaged in multiple wars and revolts with the Sultanate of the Geledi.

One of the most powerful sultanates to have emerged from Southern Somalia called the Geledi Sultanate centered in Afgooye in the late 17th century. It incorporated the Merca territory into its kingdom until the Bimaal rebelled in the mid-1800s for independence. The Sultanate of Geledi tried to attack and destroy the Bimaal clan many times to try and re-capture the coastal city of Merca. But the Bimal of Merca managed to defeat the Geledi Sultanate 2 times. In 1843 Yusuf Mahamud, Sultan of Geledi, vowed to destroy the Bimaal for once and for all and mobilizes the Geledi army. In 1848 the sultan of the Geledi, Yusuf Mahamud was is killed at Adaddey Suleyman, a village near Merca, in a battle between the Bimaal and Geledi Sultanate. His son Sultan Ahmed Yusuf tried to see revenge but was also killed in 1878 at Agaaran, near Marka by the Bimal. Ensuing Merca independence from Geledi's overrule 

The Biimaal sultanate maintained armies, courts, prisons, and were highly dynamic and out seeking eager to link with global trade. They invited experts from India and around the world, to train their people in skills such as weaving, textile industry, milling and agricultural production, and topographical surveys used to make irrigation canals. This massive development the Biimaal were undertaking with their sultanate was sabotaged by the Italians, which was one of the reasons why the Biimaal revolt began.

The Bimaal also engage in pastoral-ism, settled farming and were also successful merchants and traders in the 19th century. The Bimaal have proved in the past to be a bellicose clan, not only against their neighbours, but also against Italian colonial encroachment.
 

The Italians undermined the Biimaal Sultanate, and changed the traditional structures in the South Central by re titling the elders "capo qabiil" and incorporating them into their administrative system. The Bimaal violently resisted the imposition of colonialism fought against the Italian colonialists in a twenty-year war known as the Bimaal revolt in which many of their warriors assassinated several Italian governors.
The Bimal also formed their own organization during the Somali Civil War, the Southern Somali National Movement (SSNM). Colonel Abdi Warsame in 1993, broke with General Aideed and took part of the SSNM with him when he aligned himself with Ali Mahdi.

Bīmāl revolt 
The Bimal Revolt or Bimal Resistance or Merca Revolt (Somali : Dagaalkii Biimaal iyo Talyaaniga ) is widely known resistance or war fought against the colonials in southern Somalia in and around the current Lower Shebelle, Banadir , Middle Shabelle (Somali: Shabeela Hoose) for decades 1896 - 1926 which can be compared to the war of the Mad Mullah in northern Somalia.

For more about the Bimal resistance or revolt visit the following:

Abdirahman Eremage( Gaadsan) 
The Gaadsen or reer Aw-Gaadsan branch of the Bimaal. The Aw Gaadsen trace themselves from holy men and sheikhs living as pastoral nomads. Such religious lineages of sheikhs and holy-men are generally referred to as 'reer aw' or 'wadaaddo'. They are nominally men of God' possessed of blessing by definition rather than learned. Although it doesn't necessary mean that all their lineages make religion their profession. The name of Geedsan or gadsen is a nickname, which means "genuine"  given by his Scholar called Sheikh Abdirahman Ulamadoobe. Gaadsan are mainly found in Somali Galbeed (Somali region) and live in regions such as Afdher, in Jarrati and surrounding areas, Nusdasriq town in Qoraxay and Liban region. Gaadsan are also found in Somalia in Bakool, Geddo and the two jubas as well as Kenya (NFD)

 Clan tree 
The following list is based on the People of the Horn of Africa'' and a paper published in March 2002 by Ambroso GuidoBimaal (Jamal) bin Mahamed'''
 Sa'ad
 Saleban
 Ismiin
 Abdirahman (Gaadsan)

Indian Ocean slave trade 
Biimal were the only Somali clan involved in the Indian Ocean slave trade as reported by the Italians, the Biimal sultanate was one of the most powerful sultanate in southerner Somalia and brought many Bantu slaves to its land. The Bantus were forced labour on Biimal-owned plantations while some were sold as part of the Indian Ocean slave trade. In December 1923, when Cesare Maria de Vecchi (the first Governor of Somalia) arrived in Somalia, slavery was being practiced in many areas of the country. Particularly in predominantly Biimal controlled area of Lower Shabelle region. The Italian colonial administration abolished slavery in Italian Somliland at the turn of the 20th century. However, some Somali clans notably the Biimal clan opposed this idea. The Bimaals fought Italians to keep their slaves. Although the Italians freed some Bantus from the Biimaal, some Bantu groups, remained enslaved well until the 1930s, and continued to be despised and discriminated against by large parts of Somali society.

Udubland State 
The Biimal elders and leaders established the autonomous State of Udubland on 17 February 2011 claiming both Lower Shabelle and Lower Jubba. Dr.  was elected as the president of the states of Udubland.

Notable figures

Politicians
 Abdullahi Sheikh Ismail, Former Somali Ambassador to Russian federation and EU, Former foreign minister 1990 and 2004 - 2006, Deputy prime minister and minister of constitutional affairs of TFG 2006.
 Ahmed Hassan Gabobe, former minister of Justice and Religious Affairs
 Abdirahman Haji Aden (Ibbi), former minister of fishery and marine resources of TNG 2000 - 2004, state minister 2004 - 2006
 Colonel Abdi Warsame Isaq, one of Somali Socialist Supreme Council and positioned different ministerial posts during Bare's regime, chairman of the Southern Somali National Movement (SSNM)
 Mohamed Adam Mo'alim Ali, Minister of Ministry of livestock , Forestry & Range-FGS. Former Minister of Public Works , Reconstruction & Housing - Somali Federal Government.
 Abdullahi Omar Abshir (Abshirow), the 2nd Deputy Speaker of the House of representatives of Somalia and former Deputy Minister
 General Abdullahi Ali Ahmed Waafow, former mayor of Marka city and a well known military leader who has been engaged in multiple wars in Lower shabelle with other militant and terrorists until his death in 2022.
 General maxamuud cabdi sheekh (xujaale),  the commander chief of Jubbaland state police
 Xuseen Cali Xaaji , member of Somali Federal Government parliament
 Said Mohamed ali, worked different positions in Somalia, vice chairman of SSNM and well known political figure in Somalia.
 Cornel Abdi Ali Jamame. High ranking Cornel in former Somali Armed Forces.
 General Abdi Osman Mohamed Shash (Cabdi Caluuq)
 Axmed Cumar Shaati, interim chairman of the Freedom fighters in Somali region.
 Colonel Ibrahim Yahia Hassan, 
 Colonel Abdi Ali Abdullahi 
 Colonel Abdi Ali (Abdi Ingiris) 
 Farxiya Maxamed Cabdi,  member of Somali Federal Government parliament.
 Cornel Balbaal C, High ranking Cornel in former Somali Armed Forces.
 Cabdullahi Xuseen Cali, member of Somali Federal Government parliament.

Religious leaders
Sheikh Abdi Abikar Gafle, famous religious leader and warrior
Macalin Mursal, One of the Biimal revolt leaders
Sheekh Abdurahman Mubarak, one of the most famous sheikhs in Somalia
Sheekh Xassan Yusuf
Sheekh Macalin Shiikheey one of the famous Somali cleric 
Sheik Mohammed Kulale

Activist
 Mana Haji, peace activist.
 Isse Sheikh Ismail, prominent peace activist.
 Abdisatar Ona, prominent Instagram influencer and Somali Cultural Leader

References

Somali clans